The year 2017 is the 8th year in the history of Australian Fighting Championship (AFC), a mixed martial arts promotion based in Australia. In 2017 AFC held 4 events.

Events list

AFC 21 

AFC 21 was an event meant to be held on 28 October 2017, at AFC Arena in Xi'an, Shaanxi, China. The event was cancelled and instead was held on 28 October 2017, at Melbourne Pavilion, Melbourne, Australia.

Results

AFC 20 

AFC 20 was an event held on 28 July 2017, at Melbourne Pavilion, Melbourne, Australia.

Results

AFC 19 

AFC 19 was an event held on 15 April 2017, at AFC Arena in Xi'an, Shaanxi, China.

Results

AFC 18 

AFC 18 was an event held on 14 April 2017, at AFC Arena in Xi'an, Shaanxi, China.

Results

References 

2017 in mixed martial arts
2017 in Australian sport
AFC (mixed martial arts) events